The John C. Boyle Dam is a hydroelectric dam located in southern Oregon, United States.  It is on the upper Klamath River, south (downstream) of Keno, and about 12 miles north of the California border. Originally developed and known as Big Bend, the John C. Boyle dam and powerhouse complex was re-dedicated to honor the pioneer hydroelectric engineer who was responsible for the design of
virtually all of the Klamath Hydroelectric Project.

The Boyle Diversion Dam includes several sections (earth-fill, concrete gravity, intake and spillway) that
combine to form an overall crest length of 714.3 feet with a height of 68 feet. The concrete spillway portion
contains three gates and forms the John C. Boyle Reservoir. Fish screens, fish ladder, and related features are
also present at the site.

The dam produces power at peak times, meaning sometimes it produces electricity and returns water to the river; other times only a small amount of water is returned to the river. This causes a "bathtub" ring effect downstream of the plant's turbines.

The John C. Boyle Dam is one of four on the Klamath River that would be removed under the Klamath Economic Restoration Act. As of February 2016, the states of Oregon and California, the dam owners, federal regulators and other parties reached an agreement to remove all four dams by the year 2020, pending approval by the Federal Energy Regulatory Commission (FERC). As of October 2020, negotiations stalled. As of February 25, 2022, the FERC released their final Environmental Impact Statement (EIS) on the dam's removal. The dam is expected to be removed sometime in 2023 or 2024. The social movement to Un-Dam the Klamath has been ongoing for 20 years.

It is named after John C. Boyle (1899-1979), who was vice president, general manager, and long-time chief engineer of the California Oregon Power Company (COPCO), a privately held utility that served southern Oregon and portions of northern California.

See also

 List of lakes in Oregon
 Klamath River
 Boyle Powerhouse to Copco Reservoir – American Whitewater

References

Dams in Oregon
PacifiCorp dams
Hydroelectric power plants in Oregon
Buildings and structures in Klamath County, Oregon
Dams completed in 1958
Energy infrastructure completed in 1958
1958 establishments in Oregon
Earth-filled dams
Gravity dams
Dams on the Klamath River